Kate Abdo (born 8 September 1981, Manchester, England) is an English sports broadcaster who currently hosts UEFA Champions League coverage for CBS Sports and Fox Sports' FIFA World Cup Tonight. Throughout her career she has worked internationally in the United Kingdom, Spain, France, Germany and the United States.

Career 
Abdo's broadcasting career started at the German international news network Deutsche Welle in 2005, in which she completed an internship in the foreign language department. In 2006–07, she worked as a production assistant for Goal! The Bundesliga Magazine, and at the same time was sports news presenter at Deutsche Welle until 2009, where she hosted sports coverage for their English and German-language services. 

From there she moved to CNN, where she anchored the "World Sports" program daily. She also hosted the "Inside Africa" feature show. Abdo left CNN to join Sky Sport News HD in Germany, where she was head anchor and the face of the network. Abdo joined to be a public face for the launch of the network and was also heavily involved in the development of the network's coverage, formats and programming.

From Germany, Abdo moved to the UK to join Sky Sports, where she hosted the Pay Per View Boxing events, European Football, Transfer Deadline day and Sky Sports News. Sky Sports loaned Abdo to Fox Sports to host their coverage of the Women's World Cup in 2015, and Abdo later took up a permanent offer from the network to relocate to the US and host their Champions League, Europa League, World Cup, FA Cup, and Bundesliga coverage. On three occasions (2010, 2011 and 2013), she acted as presenter for the UEFA Europa League group stage draw in Monaco.

Since being at Fox, she has also now taken on the role of hosting Fox's Premier Boxing Champions, including a regular studio show "Inside PBC Boxing" and fight night coverage. After Fox lost the rights to Champions League to Turner, Abdo also signed a deal to host Champions League coverage on TNT from Turner's Atlanta studios.

Abdo is also well known for her role hosting the FIFA Ballon d'Or and Laureus World Sports Awards, both of which she hosted on numerous occasions. At the 2014 FIFA Ballon d'Or ceremony she spoke with contestants and guests in four languages. She was also a host for the 2015 FIFA Ballon d'Or.

After losing major soccer rights and the cancellation of ‘’Inside PBC’’, Abdo left Fox Sports.  However, she has returned to Fox to host their nightly FIFA World Cup show in Qatar.

In 2020, Abdo returned to the UK to work for CBS Sports as the host of the UEFA Champions League and Europa League.

Abdo still works in the US for DAZN's boxing coverage.

Personal life
Born in Manchester, she studied at Christ the King School, Manchester, and Withington Girls' School. She moved to Spain at the age of 17, learned Spanish, and took her high school diploma. A year later, she began a degree at the University of Málaga in 2003 where she studied "Translation and Interpreting." Abdo also took time out of her studies to live in France and Germany. She also graduated from the University of Salford with a first-class B.A. (Hons) in European Languages. Having lived in Spain, France and Germany, Abdo is fluent in all three languages.

Her father, Tom Giles, is an avid Manchester United fan, and was a special guest when he was interviewed by Peter Schmeichel live at Etihad Stadium in 2023. 

She married Ramtin Abdo (Abdolmajid), a German businessman and investor, in 2010. She is of Guyanese descent through her maternal grandmother. She is a Manchester United fan.

References

External links

CNN Profile
Fox Sports Profile

British women journalists
1981 births
Living people
CNN people
British sports journalists
University of Málaga alumni
Alumni of the University of Salford
Journalists from Manchester
Women sports journalists
Fox Sports 1 people
English people of Guyanese descent
21st-century British journalists